The Melges 30 is an American sailboat that was designed by Reichel/Pugh as a racer and first built in 1996.

The design was replaced in the product line by the Melges 32 in 2004.

Production
The design was built by Melges Performance Sailboats in the United States, from 1996 until 1999, but only 18 boats were completed before production ended.

Design
The boat was intended to form a one-design class and also be used for PHRF handicap racing.

The Melges 30 is a racing keelboat, built predominantly of fiberglass and carbon fiber. It has a fractional sloop rig, a plumb stem, a reverse transom, an internally mounted spade-type rudder controlled by a tiller with an extension and a lifting keel with a weighted bulb. It displaces  and carries  of lead ballast in the keel bulb.

The design made extensive use of carbon fiber components, including the mast, rudder, the keel fin and bowsprit.

The boat is fitted with a Japanese Yanmar 260 diesel engine of  powering a saildrive for docking and maneuvering. The fuel tank holds .

Operational history
In a 2000 review naval architect Robert Perry wrote, "the Melges group and the Reichel/Pugh team have come out with a 30-foot version of the 24. For local fleets this boat may be even harder to deal with than the 24. You could always excuse the 24 as it blew by you with, "It's just a big dinghy." But this 30-footer, with its engine and the addition of lifelines and pulpits, almost looks like a normal boat and will give PHRF raters a fit. Actually, it's in a class of its own. I can think of no other boat that is designed with this particular balance of parameters. In a nutshell, this design appears aimed at providing the fastest monohull ride around without the fear of capsizing."

See also
List of sailing boat types

References

External links
Official website archives on Archive.org

Keelboats
1990s sailboat type designs
Sailing yachts
One-design sailing classes
Sailboat type designs by Reichel/Pugh
Sailboat types built by Melges Performance Sailboats